St. Clair County is the name of four counties in the United States:

 St. Clair County, Alabama
 St. Clair County, Illinois
 St. Clair County, Michigan
 St. Clair County, Missouri